Suzy Q is a 1999 Dutch film starring Carice van Houten and directed by Martin Koolhoven. It is based on the childhood memories of Frouke Fokkema, who wrote the script together with Koolhoven. The film featured van Houten in her first leading role; she worked again with Koolhoven on the films AmnesiA and Brimstone.

Plot
The film is set in the sixties and revolves around the teenager Suzy, who is part of an uncaring family: father is abusive and unemployed, mother is naive, one brother is the brooding type while the other is habitually stoned.

Suzy surreptitiously manages to gain access to the hotel room of Mick Jagger and Marianne Faithfull during their visit to Amsterdam. Suzy gets kissed by her idol Jagger and wants to tell the world, but nobody believes her or even wants to hear the story.

Background
The film is a joint production of Staccato Films and the Dutch public broadcasting service.

The title refers to The Rolling Stones' cover of the Dale Hawkins song Susie Q.

Suzy Q won various awards, including a Gouden Kalf for van Houten. Despite being a film was made for TV, it was the most decorated Dutch film of 1999. Due to the frequent use of music by the likes of The Rolling Stones, The Turtles, Jimi Hendrix, Tee-Set and Booker T & the MG's, the film was never released in cinemas or on DVD.

In 2014, to save his project from obscurity, Martin Koolhoven published the film on YouTube. He also asked for the film to be distributed via torrent sites, which promptly happened.

Cast
Carice van Houten as Suzy
Roeland Fernhout as Zwier
Linda van Dyck as Ruth (Suzy's mother)
Jack Wouterse as Ko (Suzy's father)
Michiel Huisman as Palmer
Ricky Koole as Betty
Kim la Croix as Hanna
Cees Geel as Jimmy
Andrew Richard as Mick Jagger
Miranda Raison as Marianne Faithfull
Hugo Koolschijn as Fotographer
Leonoor Pauw as Receptionist
Halina Reijn as Prostitute
Frans de Wit as Bartender
Joanne Gomperts as Girl outside hotel

References

External links

1990s Dutch-language films
Dutch television films
Dutch drama films
Dutch comedy films
Tragicomedy films
1999 television films
1999 films
Films set in 1967
Films set in Amsterdam
1990s comedy albums
1999 comedy-drama films